In Ohio, State Route 127 may refer to:
U.S. Route 127 in Ohio, the only Ohio highway numbered 127 since 1927
Ohio State Route 127 (1923-1927), now SR 129